Goth means "village" in Sindhi language. Goth is a prefix or postfix in village names in Sindh, Pakistan. Goth can also be a small neighborhood in Karachi populated mainly by the Sindhi people.

Goth LakhMooR Sindh Pakistan 
 Machi Goth
 Somar Goth
 Rehman Goth
 Rais Goth

See also
Parts of region and settlement names:

 khel means settlement or town. Example: Darra Adam Khel درہ آدم خیل.
 -abad means settlement or town. Example: Islamabad, Faisalabad.
 dera- means settlement or town. Example: Dera Ismail Khan.
 -garh means fort or settlement. Example: Islamgarh.
 Goth means settlement or town. Example: Yousuf Goth.
 -istan means land. Example: Pakistan.
 -kot means settlement or town. Example: Islamkot, Sialkot.
 -nagar means settlement or town. Example: Islamnagar.
 -pur means settlement or town. Example: Nasarpur.
  -wala  means settlement or town. Example: Gujranwala.

References 

Geography of Pakistan